Gesonula is a genus of grasshoppers (Caelifera: Acrididae) in the subfamily Oxyinae. Species can be found in India through southeast Asia to northeast Australia.

Species
The Orthoptera Species File lists:
Gesonula mundata (Walker, 1870)
Gesonula punctifrons (Stål, 1861) type species (as Acridium punctifrons Stål)
Gesonula szemaoensis Zheng, 1977

References

Oxyinae
Acrididae genera
Insects of Asia
Orthoptera of Indo-China